Russians in Israel or Russian Israelis are post-Soviet Russian citizens who immigrate to Israel and their descendants. As of 2022, Russian-speakers number around 1,300,000 people, or 15% of the Israeli population. This number, however, also includes immigrants from the Soviet Union and post-Soviet states other than Russia proper.

Some of the immigrants are not considered Jewish according to Halacha, which defines a Jew if their mother is Jewish or they formally converted to Judaism. According to the Law of Return, anybody with at least one Jewish grandparent is eligible to become an Israeli citizen. Because of the Soviet Union's policy of state atheism and Russia's historically large Jewish population, there were some mixed marriages between Russian Jews and ethnic Russians during the Communist period. Some Russian Israelis are Jewish only by marriage, as the Law of Return also allows the non-Jewish spouses of Jews to claim Israeli citizenship. A few Russian Israelis are instead descended from Russian Subbotnik families, who have migrated to Israel over the past century. 

Most Russians in Israel have full Israeli citizenship. Israeli Russians are involved in the country's economy on all levels.

Communities

Subbotniks
Russian Subbotnik families settled in Ottoman Syria in the 1880s as part of the First Aliyah in order to escape oppression in the Russian Empire and later mostly intermarried with local Jews. Their descendants included Israeli Jews such as Alexander Zaïd, Rafael Eitan, Ariel Sharon and  Major-General Alik Ron.

In 2004, the Sephardic Chief Rabbi of Israel Shlomo Amar ruled the Subbotniks were not defined as Jewish and would have to undergo an Orthodox conversion. The Interior Ministry classified the Subbotniks as a Christian sect and ineligible for aliyah to Israel, because no one knew if their ancestors had formally converted to Judaism (and there is much historic evidence that they did not). However, this ruling was abolished in 2014, with Subbotniks allowed to retain their Jewish status in Israel, with an attempt by the Interior Ministry to allow remaining Subbotnik families to immigrate to Israel.

Society

The Russian people within Israel have citizen status and are involved in the country's economy and society on all levels. Among the notable members of the community are social media star Anna Zak; actress and former MK Anastassia Michaeli; Footballer Alexander Uvarov who was naturalized in 2004; Actor Kirill Safonov; poet and composer Yuliy Kim, and many others.

Religion
Most Russian Israelis are atheists or otherwise non-religious, although about 40,000 belong to the Russian Orthodox Church according to a recent census. It is estimated that another 10,000 are practitioners of Messianic Judaism, a loose term referring to those who combine elements of Christianity with elements of Judaism and Jewish tradition. A significant number of Russian Israelis have also undergone conversion to Orthodox Judaism.

See also 

 1990s post-Soviet aliyah
 Israel–Russia relations
 Russian Jews in Israel
 Russian language in Israel
 Church of Mary Magdalene
 Russian Compound
 History of the Jews in the Soviet Union
 Demographics of the Soviet Union
 Patrol 36

References 

 
Israel–Russia relations